Dawn of a New Century (released 20 April 1999 by Universal Music, Norway – 546 120-2 / Philips) is the third album by Irish-Norwegian duo Secret Garden, released by Philips Records in 1999.

Capercaillie's frontwoman Karen Matheson performed as a soloist for the song "Prayer".

Reception 
Allmusic reviewer Michael Gallucci awarded the album 3 stars.

Track listing

Credits 
Violin – Fionnuala Sherry
Lead Vocals – Anne Karin Kaasa, Fionnuala Sherry, Karen Matheson & Nikki Matheson
Keyboards & Piano – Rolf Løvland
Keyboards – Bjørn Ole Rasch
Electric guitar – Terje Rypdal
Guitar – Rolf Kristensen
Additional guitar - Alf Emil Eik
Classical guitar – Lars Hanniball
Hardingfele (Hardanger Fiddle) – Annbjørg Lien
Narrator – John Kavanagh
Oboe, English Horn – Henrik Eurenius
Choir – Anúna
Orchestra – Irish National Symphony Orchestra, RTÉ Concert Orchestra
Recorder & bagpipes – Hans Fredrik Jacobsen
Whistle – Hans Fredrik Jacobsen & Mick O'Brien
Accordion – Máirtín O'Connor
Bass – Per Elias Drabløs
Dizi (Chinese flutes) – Steinar Ofsdal
Drums, Percussion – Noel Eccles & Ottar Nesje
Backing Vocals – Alf Emil Eik, Nikki Matheson, Rolf Løvland
Bagpipes [Uilleann] – Mick O'Brien & Pat Broaders
Percussion, Bodhrán, Spoons, Bones – Tommy Hayes

Credits 
Engineer – Alf Emil Eik, Andrew Boland, Oskar Pall Sveinson, Trond Engebretsen
Co-producer – Fionnuala Sherry
Composer, producer & arranger – Rolf Løvland

References

1999 albums
Secret Garden (duo) albums